Alois Jagodic (born 24 March 1946) is an Austrian footballer. He played in two matches for the Austria national football team in 1971. He won the Austrian Cup with the club Rapid Vienna. He's also worked as a manager for SK Kühnsdorf. He made his debut on 11 July 1971 against Brazil (1-1).

References

External links
 

1946 births
Living people
Austrian footballers
Austria international footballers
Place of birth missing (living people)
Association footballers not categorized by position